East Yangon District is a district of the Yangon Region in Myanmar.

Townships
 Botataung
 Dagon Seikkan
 Dawbon
 East Dagon
 Mingala Taungnyunt
 North Dagon
 North Okkalapa
 Pazundaung
 South Dagon
 South Okkalapa
 Tamwe
 Thaketa
 Thingangyun
 Yankin

References 

Districts of Myanmar